Brooke Cemetery is a historic rural cemetery located at Wellsburg, Brooke County, West Virginia. It was founded in 1857. It includes several notable examples of funerary art in its headstones, above ground crypts, and mausolea dating to the 19th and early 20th century.  It was designed by John Chislett, who also designed Allegheny Cemetery in Pittsburgh, Pennsylvania.

It was listed on the National Register of Historic Places in 1986.

Noteworthy interments
 Oliver Brown (1753–1846), Brooke County Militia and Revolutionary War officer
 Isaac H. Duval (1824–1902), member of the United States House of Representatives from 1869 to 1871, and a brigadier general in the Union Army
 Patrick Gass (1771–1870), member of the Corps of Discovery

References

External links
 

Cemeteries on the National Register of Historic Places in West Virginia
Buildings and structures in Brooke County, West Virginia
National Register of Historic Places in Brooke County, West Virginia
1857 establishments in Virginia
Rural cemeteries